Kampinos National Park is a National Park in east-central Poland, in Masovian Voivodeship, on the north-west outskirts of Warsaw. It has a sister park agreement with Indiana Dunes National Park, Indiana, United States.

The idea of creating a park here appeared for the first time in the 1920s. In the 1930s the first forest reserves were opened: Granica, Sieraków and Zamczysko. Today, these reserves are much larger and are strictly protected.

It covers the ancient Kampinos Forest (Puszcza Kampinoska), and in January 2000 the area was added to UNESCO’s list of biosphere reserves. The Park is now slightly smaller than originally, covering , of which 46.38 km² is strictly protected. The protective zone around the Park covers 377.56 km². Forests account for around 70% of the park's area, and the most common tree is the pine. The Park's symbol is the moose.

Kampinoski National Park is located at the biggest river junction in Poland - here valleys of Vistula, Bug, Narew, Wkra and Bzura meet. There are no lakes, the biggest river of the Park is the Łasica, a tributary to the Bzura, which acts as a water canal.

Park's flora is rich with around 1245 species of plants, of which 69 are protected. Park's landscape is a mix of sand dunes and swamp lands with pine trees growing on sand and meadows on swamps.

The Park, together with a nearby valley of the Vistula, is an important thriving area of many animals. According to biologists, there are 16,000 species of animals, of which the most numerous are insects (2 030 species) and birds (200 species). Park's experts are experienced in the field of reintroducing several animals - moose (since 1951), beaver (since 1980) and lynx (since 1992). 83 species of animals are regarded as endangered.

The park's area has a rich history, here many important events connected with Polish history took place. Reminders of past are numerous and include tombs of insurrectionists from 1863 anti-Russian uprising, war cemeteries from Polish-German war of 1939 and tombs of members of anti-German resistance (1944–45). At the Palmiry cemetery lay many inhabitants of Warsaw, secretly killed here by the Germans in the years 1939-1945. At Żelazowa Wola on the outskirts of the Park, there is a manor house where famous composer Frédéric Chopin was born.

Tourists are welcome on the Park's walking, cycling, horseback and skiing trails. One can use trails of the total length of ca. 360 kilometres. Cycling enthusiasts may take advantage of the 200 km Kampinos Cycling Trail. There is also 10 educational trails introducing some specially attractive areas.

See also

Special Protection Areas in Poland

External links
 The Board of Polish National Parks: Kampinos National Park
 Warsawblog.com: Kampinos National Park photos

National parks of Poland
Parks in Masovian Voivodeship
Biosphere reserves of Poland
Natura 2000 in Poland
Protected areas established in 1959
1959 establishments in Poland
Central European mixed forests